Three test ban treaties aimed at prohibiting most nuclear weapons testing have been adopted:

 The Partial Test Ban Treaty, adopted in 1963, signed by the Soviet Union, the United Kingdom, the United States, prohibited all testing except underground tests
 Threshold Test Ban Treaty, adopted in 1974 between the United States and Soviet Union limiting the yield of nuclear tests to 150 kilotons
 Comprehensive Nuclear-Test-Ban Treaty, adopted by the United Nations General Assembly in 1996 but not in force, by which states agree to ban all nuclear explosions in all environments